Zeugodacus is a genus of tephritid  or fruit flies in the family Tephritidae.

Systematics
Many subgenera are defined within this genus:

Asiadacus
Austrodacus
Capparidacus
Diplodacus
Heminotodacus
Hemiparatridacus
Javadacus
Nesodacus
Paradacus
Parasinodacus
Paratridacus
Sinodacus
Zeugodacus

See also
List of Zeugodacus species

References

External links

Dacinae
Tephritidae genera